Ronald Aaron Feinberg (October 10, 1932 – January 29, 2005) was an American character and voice actor who appeared in films and on television.

Career
At 6' 7", the towering Feinberg played the character Fellini, opposite Don Johnson, in the post-apocalyptic film A Boy and His Dog. He appeared on television in Barney Miller, Mary Hartman, Mary Hartman, and Mission: Impossible, among other shows. He also voiced King Caliphim, the Lord of the Dead, and Gruff in King's Quest VI: Heir Today, Gone Tomorrow. He voiced the character "Raiden" from one installment of Mortal Kombat.

He appeared as the mentally disabled Benny Apa in the 1968 "Pray Love Remember, Pray Love Remember" episode of Hawaii Five-O; the character was under investigation for the murder of a college student. He also appeared in two other Hawai'i Five-0 episodes: "Little Girl Blue" and "No Bottles, No Cans, No People".

In the 1980s, he taught acting classes at the University of Miami, in Coral Gables, Florida. He also voiced Eeyore in Winnie the Pooh Discovers the Seasons (1981), memorable guest villain Titanus in three episodes of the 1994 season of Teenage Mutant Ninja Turtles and the tuba in Disney's Belle's Magical World (1998). Feinberg's other animation roles included Ming the Merciless in Defenders of the Earth, Doc Terror in Centurions and Headstrong in The Transformers.

Death
Feinberg died on January 29, 2005, in Los Angeles at the age of 72.

Filmography

Film

Television

Video games

References

External links
 
 
 Ron Feinberg | 1932 - Hollywood.com
 
 Transformers Wiki: Ron Feinberg
 Obituaries in the Performing Arts, 2005: Film, Television, Radio, Theatre: Ron Feinberg
 

1932 births
2005 deaths
American male film actors
American male television actors
American male voice actors
Male actors from San Francisco
University of Miami faculty
20th-century American male actors